is a former Japanese football player.

Club statistics

References

External links

1987 births
Living people
Association football people from Mie Prefecture
Japanese footballers
J2 League players
FC Gifu players
FC Kariya players
Association football goalkeepers